"" (Lord, strengthen me to reflect on your suffering) is a Passion hymn in German, written by Christian Fürchtegott Gellert to the melody of "", and first published in 1757. It is contained in the German Protestant hymnal Evangelisches Gesangbuch.

History 
Gellert wrote "" in 1755. It appeared first in Leipzig in 1757 in his collection Geistliche Oden und Lieder, with 22 stanzas of four lines each, titled "Passionslied" (Passion song). As the first line indicates, it is a Passiontide prayer requesting strength to think about the suffering of Jesus.  In the 1993 common Protestant hymnal, Evangelisches Gesangbuch, it appears shortened to ten stanzas and rearranged as EG 91.

Text and theme 
Gellert focuses on a reflection on the Passion of Jesus, without description of the actions as narrated by the Evangelists. Speaking in the first-person singular, he contemplates its meaning for the individual believer, both theologically and emotionally. His theological thoughts are based on the Epistles of Paul. In accordance with the contemporary anthropology, he aims to educate both the mind towards wisdom and the heart towards virtue.

The format of the stanzas, with three long lines and a final short line, was based on the Sapphic stanza of Latin hymns. Beginning with a funeral song by Bartholomäus Ringwaldt from the 17th century, the format became associated with the topics of death, Passion and solace. Gellert succeeded mostly in filling the stressed fourth line with meaning,

Melody and musical setting 
Gellert chose to write his poem to match the melody of the well-known hymn "", composed by Johann Crüger in 1640, which was based on a 1534 tune by Guilleaume Franc. Bach had included the first stanza of that hymn in his St Matthew Passion. Singers of Gellert's hymn would relate it to the context of the older hymn by Johann Heermann. The character of the melody has been described as "floating, bitter-sad, serious" ("schwebend, herb-traurig, ernst"). 
 
A four-part vocal setting by Carl Philipp Emanuel Bach, who set many songs from Gellert's collection to music in his Gellert Odes and Songs, was adapted for a publication by Carus-Verlag.

References 

1757 poems
18th-century hymns in German
Christian poetry